Springfield has been a civil parish of the Borough of Chelmsford in Essex, England, since 1907. The parish takes in the portion of the town north of river Chelmer and west of the A12 bypass and originally comprised the manors of Springfield Hall, Springfield Barnes (now Chelmer Village), Cuton Hall, and in part New Hall (now Beaulieu Park).

History
Until the 1950s the parish was a semi-rural village lying one mile north east of Chelmsford, on the old Roman Road, with little to attract the visitor outside of the annual Essex show, a half dozen pubs and the town's prison and Essex Police headquarters, both of which still lie to the east of the Roman road. The Essex show-ground was once located on fields north of The Green, and south of Pump Lane. Since this time the former show site along with a thousand or so acres of surrounding arable land have been developed to create the most populous suburb of Chelmsford.

The historic heart of the parish is centred on the Anglican All Saints Church, Springfield Place and Green. This historic heart is one of the few areas not to have been visibly transformed in the last 50 years.

Some of the listed buildings in Springfield include Springfield Hall, The Old Rectory, Springfield Place (purchased by Thomas Brograve in 1781) and Dukes Cottages.

Influence on the City of Springfield, Massachusetts

A former resident of the village of Springfield, William Pynchon, went on to become one of the leaders of the Massachusetts Bay Colony – a group of New World settlers whose capital city was Boston. In 1636, Pynchon and a group of pioneers founded Springfield, Massachusetts, beside New England's greatest river, the Connecticut River, amidst New England's most fertile soil. Originally named Agawam (now a suburb of the city itself, featuring the famous Six Flags New England amusement park), the settlement was renamed "Springfield" in Pynchon's honour, after Pynchon had suffered indignities from Connecticut's Captain John Mason – the notorious "Indian Killer" of British America's Pequot War – who expressed disdain at Pynchon's "delicate treatment" of the region's Native People. After this, Springfield forever aligned with Boston, although 89 miles separate the two, instead of aligning with Hartford, Connecticut, now the state capital of Connecticut – only 23 miles south of Springfield.

This city was the first of many across the English-speaking world to take the name of the Essex village. Among places named after Springfield, Massachusetts, is Springfield, Illinois, the capital of that state.

Education 
The parish hosts a number of schools:
 Secondary:
 New Hall School (RC)
 The Boswells School
 Primary:
 Barnes Farm School (In Chelmer Village)
 Bishops Primary School (CoE)
 Chancellor Park (In Chelmer Village)
 New Hall School (RC)
 Perryfields School
 Springfield Primary School (Formerly: Nabbotts School)
 The Tyrrells School
 Trinity Road Community School

References

External links 

Springfield Community Website
Springfield Parish Council
Springfield Green Conservation area
A Vision of Britain through Time – Springfield

Civil parishes in Essex
Chelmsford